Paucilactobacillus wasatchensis is a species of heterofermentative lactic acid bacteria (LAB). It is a non-starter LAB that was first isolated from aged Cheddar cheese showing gas defects from three different continents. The growth of P. wasatchensis is accelerated when ripening cheese is supplemented with ribose and galactose and incubated at elevated temperature (12 °C versus 6 °C). P. wasatchensis can be controlled by pasteurization, but post-pasteurization sources of contamination must be controlled.

References

Lactobacillaceae